Jameh Mosque of Ardakan dates back to the Safavid dynasty and is located in Ardakan, next to the public library.

Sources

Mosques in Iran
Mosque buildings with domes
National works of Iran
Ardakan